The Rostock Matrikelportal (matriculation portal) disseminates about 186,000 individual-level datasets drawn from the student registers of the University of Rostock from its establishment in 1419 to today. Each entry is faithfully transcribed and linked with a digitized image of a student's original, partly handwritten register entry. Users may search and comment on individual entries thus expanding the information on single students. Places of origin are geo-tagged and displayed on interactive maps. Additional links refer to professors that were active at the time of matriculation (see: Catalogus Professorum Rostochiensium) and lectures held. Integrated Authority Files (GNDs) identify notable students and interlink them with further personal data web portals and platforms on the Internet.

References

External links 
 
 Rostock Matrikelportal

University of Rostock
History of universities
2008 establishments in Germany
Online person databases